(PanSTARRS) is a Chiron-type comet or active centaur orbiting in the outer Solar System between Jupiter and Saturn. It was discovered on 24 June 2020, by the Pan-STARRS survey at Haleakala Observatory in Hawaii, United States.

Size
A lower limit for the absolute magnitude of the nucleus is Hg =  that, for an albedo in the range 0.1—0.04, gives an upper limit for its size in the interval .

Colors
The comet's color indices, (g′–r′) =  and (r′–i′) = , indicates the comet's nucleus has a neutral or gray color.

Activity
 was discovered in outburst state and by late 2020, it had returned to its regular brightness. It was recovered by the Lowell Discovery Telescope at an extremely faint apparent magnitude of 24.5 in September 2022. It was officially recognized as a comet by the Minor Planet Center on 20 November 2022, in which it was given the periodic comet designation .

Orbital evolution
Centaurs have short dynamical lives due to strong interactions with the giant planets.  follows a very chaotic orbital evolution that may lead it to be ejected from the Solar System during the next 200,000 yr. Extensive numerical simulations indicate that  may have experienced relatively close flybys with comet 29P/Schwassmann–Wachmann, in some cases with one of both objects were transient Jovian satellites; during these events,  may have crossed the coma of comet 29P when in outburst.

See also

References

External links 
 

Cometary object articles
Comets in 2020

Minor planet object articles (unnumbered)
20200624